Richard Olney (1835–1917) was United States Attorney General and Secretary of State .

Richard Olney may also refer to:

Richard Olney II (1871–1939), member of the United States House of Representatives from Massachusetts
Richard K. Olney (1947–2012), American physician and pioneer in clinical research on amyotrophic lateral sclerosis
Richard Olney (food writer) (1927–1999), American painter, cook, food writer, editor and memoirist